Belén Adaluz Casetta (born 26 September 1994) is an Argentine runner specialising in the 3000 metres steeplechase.

With the personal best of 9:25.99 in the event, she is the current national record and the current South American record holder.

Competition record

Personal bests
Outdoor
1500 metres – 4:19.21 (Fresno State E.E.U.U 2017)
3000 metres – 8:55.96 (Memphis 2022)
3000 metres steeplechase – 9:25.99 (London 2017) NR
5000 metres – 16:23:61 (Mar del Plata 2016)
10km – 35:19 (Mar del Plata 2017)

References

External links 
 
 
 

Living people
1994 births
Argentine female steeplechase runners
Athletes (track and field) at the 2015 Pan American Games
Athletes (track and field) at the 2019 Pan American Games
Athletes (track and field) at the 2010 Summer Youth Olympics
Athletes (track and field) at the 2016 Summer Olympics
Olympic athletes of Argentina
Pan American Games bronze medalists for Argentina
Pan American Games medalists in athletics (track and field)
Universiade medalists for Argentina
Universiade medalists in athletics (track and field)
Competitors at the 2017 Summer Universiade
Medalists at the 2019 Summer Universiade
Medalists at the 2019 Pan American Games
Athletes (track and field) at the 2020 Summer Olympics
Sportspeople from Mar del Plata